The Seven Arches Bridge is a historic bridge in Newport, County Mayo, Ireland.

Built around 1892, the bridge is a seven span squared red sandstone structure with limestone detailing over the Black Oak River/Newport River. It carried the Achill branch of the Midland Great Western Railway line, with the last train running on this line in the autumn of 1937. It was recently restored as part of the Great Western Greenway, the longest off-road cycling & walking route in Ireland.

The bridge is listed as number 112 on the Record of Protected Structures for County Mayo.

Technical Details 
The cost of the viaduct was over £7,000.

The rail line over the viaduct was not opened until 1894 pending completion of a nearby tunnel.

References

External links

Railway bridges in the Republic of Ireland
Buildings and structures in County Mayo
Rail trail bridges